Lars Gandrup Dresler (2 January 1968 – 7 November 1995) was a Danish figure skater. He was the 1990 Nordic champion and a five-time Danish national (1984–88). Dresler served as Denmark's flag bearer at the 1988 Winter Olympics in Calgary. He finished 14th overall after placing 14th in the compulsory figures, 12th in the short program, and 15th in the free skate. He trained at Gladsaxe Skøjteløber Forening. He was coached by Lorna Brown.

Competitive highlights

References 

1968 births
1995 deaths
Danish male single skaters
Figure skaters at the 1988 Winter Olympics
People from Gentofte Municipality
Olympic figure skaters of Denmark
Sportspeople from the Capital Region of Denmark